St. Giles is a historic home located at Hebron, Wicomico County, Maryland, United States. It is a -story frame Federal period farmhouse, with a 20th-century hyphen and wing. Also on the property are several outbuildings, including a well house, wood house, tenant house, barn, garage, and pool house. The landscaped grounds include a garden which is thought to retain its original early-19th-century layout.

St. Giles was listed on the National Register of Historic Places in 1982.

References

External links
, including undated photo, at Maryland Historical Trust

Houses on the National Register of Historic Places in Maryland
Houses in Wicomico County, Maryland
Federal architecture in Maryland
National Register of Historic Places in Wicomico County, Maryland